Yegor Alekseyenko (born 31 October 1998) is a Belarusian former professional footballer.

After leaving Gorodeya in 2018, Alekseyenko moved to Israel, where he played for some amateur teams.

References

External links 
 
 Profile at FC Gorodeya website

1998 births
Living people
Belarusian footballers
Association football forwards
FC Gorodeya players